Santo António or Santo Antônio (Portuguese for "Saint Anthony") may refer to the following places:

In Brazil

Barra de Santo Antônio, Alagoas
Novo Santo Antônio, Piauí
Riacho de Santo Antônio, Paraíba
Santo Antônio, Rio Grande do Norte, Rio Grande do Norte
Santo Antônio da Alegria, São Paulo
Santo Antônio do Amparo, Minas Gerais
Santo Antônio do Aracanguá, São Paulo
Santo Antônio do Aventureiro, Minas Gerais
Santo Antônio da Barra, Goiás
Santo Antônio do Caiuá, Paraná
Santo Antônio do Descoberto, Goiás
Santo Antônio de Goiás, Goiás
Santo Antônio do Grama, Minas Gerais
Santo Antônio do Içá, Amazonas
Santo Antônio do Itambé, Minas Gerais
Santo Antônio do Jacinto, Minas Gerais
Santo Antônio do Jardim, São Paulo
Santo Antônio de Jesus, Bahia
Santo Antônio do Leverger, Mato Grosso
Santo Antônio de Lisboa, Piauí
Santo Antônio de Lisboa, Santa Catarina
Santo Antônio dos Lopes, Maranhão
Santo Antônio dos Milagres, Piauí
Santo Antônio das Missões, Rio Grande do Sul
Santo Antônio do Monte, Minas Gerais
Santo Antônio de Pádua, Rio de Janeiro
Santo Antônio do Palma, Rio Grande do Sul
Santo Antônio do Paraíso, Paraná
Santo Antônio da Patrulha, Rio Grande do Sul
Santo Antônio do Pinhal, São Paulo
Santo Antônio do Planalto, Rio Grande do Sul
Santo Antônio da Platina, Paraná
Santo Antônio de Posse, São Paulo
Santo Antônio do Retiro, Minas Gerais
Santo Antônio do Rio Abaixo, Minas Gerais
Santo Antônio do Sudoeste, Paraná
Santo Antônio do Tauá, Para

In Cape Verde
Santo António (Fogo), in the island of Fogo
Santo António (Maio), in the island of Maio

In Portugal
Santo António (Lisbon), a parish in the municipality of Lisbon

In the Azores

Santo António (Ponta Delgada), a parish in the municipality of Ponta Delgada
Santo António (São Roque do Pico), a parish in the municipality of São Roque do Pico

In Madeira

Santo António (Funchal), a parish in the municipality of Funchal
Santo António da Serra (Machico), a parish in the municipality of Machico 
Santo António da Serra (Santa Cruz), a parish in the municipality of Santa Cruz

In Macau

Santo António, Macau, a parish on the Macau Peninsula

In São Tomé and Príncipe
Santo António

See also
Sant'Antonio (disambiguation)
San Antonio (disambiguation)
Saint Anthony (disambiguation)